Velan Studios is an American video game developer based in Troy, New York. Founded in 2016 by Guha Bala and Karthik Bala, the studio is most known for developing Mario Kart Live: Home Circuit (2020) and Knockout City (2021).

History 
Velan Studios was founded in November 2016 by Guha Bala and Karthik Bala. The Bala brothers previously founded Vicarious Visions in 1991 and left the company in April 2016. According to the founders, the studio aimed to develop "breakthrough experimental games", and the term "velan" stands for "spear bearer" in Tamil. In July 2017, the team successful raised $7 million in venture capital for their first project. The studio's first game was Mario Kart Live: Home Circuit. The team completed the game's first prototype in 2017 and Nintendo greenlit the project after meeting the team in their headquarters in Kyoto. Home Circuit utilizes physical radio-controlled cars responding to how the player plays in-game, and Velan Studios was responsible for developing the software, while Nintendo focused on creating the hardware. The game received generally positive reviews when it was released in October 2020.

In March 2019, Electronic Arts announced that it had partnered with Velan Studios to release a "team-based action" game. The game was published under the EA Originals program, EA's initiative to support independent games. The program allowed the studio to retain full creative control while receiving most of the game's profit after development cost was recouped. The game, titled Knockout City, was released in May 2021. The game attracted 2 million players within its first week of release.

Games

References

External links 
 

2016 establishments in New York (state)
Video game companies established in 2016
Video game companies of the United States
Video game development companies
Indie video game developers